The 2015 Torneo Descentralizado de Fútbol Profesional (known as the 2015 Copa Movistar for sponsorship reasons) is the 99th season of the highest division of Peruvian football. A total of 17 teams have been confirmed to compete in the season after Alianza Atlético were reinstated in the first division following their relegation in 2011.

Competition modus

The competition will be played with 17 teams after the restitution of Alianza Atlético's place in the first division. The championship will be divided into several stages.

The first tournament to be played will be the 2015 Torneo del Inca—played by the 17 teams in 3 groups. Subsequently, the Torneo Apertura will have all teams play each other once either home or away while the Torneo Clausura will repeat those matches but reversing the home or away ground. The winners of these three tournaments will advance to the semi-finals of the playoff phase at the end of the season granted they each finish at least eighth in the aggregate table or above. The aggregate table will consist of the results of only the Torneo Apertura and Torneo Clausura. The fourth team to advance to the semi-finals will be the best placed team in the aggregate table that did not win any of the three tournaments.

Should one team win two of the three tournaments, they will automatically advance to the finals of the playoff phase and the semi-finals will be played by the team that won the remaining tournament and the best placed team on the aggregate table. Should one team win all three tournaments they will automatically become season champions. The aggregate table will also determine the three teams to be relegated at the end of the season.

The teams that qualify for the international competitions will be:

Notes

Teams
A total of 17 teams have been confirmed to play in the 2015 Torneo Descentralizado. Fourteen teams from the previous season, the 2014 Segunda División champion (Deportivo Municipal), the 2014 Copa Perú champion (Sport Loreto), and Alianza Atlético which were reinstated in the first division following their relegation in 2011.

Stadia and locations

Torneo del Inca

The Torneo del Inca was the first major phase of the overall season. Although the previous season's Torneo del Inca was not part of the national championship, this season the Torneo del Inca's champion could advance to the playoffs if they finish in the top eight of the Torneo Descentralizado's aggregate table. The Torneo del Inca was divided into 3 stages. The first stage was a group stage, the second stage was the semifinals played over two legs, and the third stage was the final. Universidad César Vallejo defeated Alianza Lima in the final.

Torneo Apertura

Standings

Results

Torneo Clausura

Standings

Clausura play-off
Because Melgar and Real Garcilaso tied with 29 points a title play-off on neutral ground was played as the tournament rules specify.

Results

Aggregate table

Playoff phase

Semi-finals
The teams that will qualify to the semi-finals will be the first place team on the aggregate table, the Torneo Apertura winner, the Torneo Clausura winner, and the 2015 Torneo del Inca winner. A draw will be held to determine the match-ups.

First leg

Second leg

Third place play-off
The two losing semi-finalists will play in a match to determine the third place team of the season.

Finals
The two winning semi-finalists will contest the finals.

See also
2015 Torneo del Inca
2015 Torneo de Promoción y Reserva

References

External links 

  
Tournament regulations 
Torneo Descentralizado news at Peru.com 
Torneo Descentralizado statistics and news at Dechalaca.com 

2015
1